Al Carlson may refer to:

 Al Carlson (basketball) (born 1951), American basketball player
 Al Carlson (politician) (born 1948), American politician